Sir William Hutt, KCB, PC (6 October 1801 – 24 November 1882) was a British Liberal politician who was heavily involved in the colonisation of New Zealand and South Australia.

Background and education
Hutt was born in Bishops Stortford, Hertfordshire. He was the brother of Sir George Hutt and John Hutt, the second governor of Western Australia. He was educated privately at Ryde, Isle of Wight, and Camberwell, and graduated BA (1827) and MA (1831) from Trinity College, Cambridge.

Political career
Hutt entered Parliament as MP for Kingston upon Hull in 1832, holding the seat until 1837, when William Wilberforce defeated him. He regained it in 1838 when Wilberforce was unseated on petition. He had an interest in colonial affairs, and became increasingly involved in them. He served as a member of the select committee on colonial lands in 1836; as a commissioner for the foundation of South Australia; as a member of the New Zealand Association from 1837; and as a member of the select committee on New Zealand in 1840.  He also helped form (1839) the re-incarnated New Zealand Company, of which he later became a director and chairman.

After he ceased to be MP for Hull in 1841, he successfully stood for the seat of Gateshead, a seat that he retained for over 30 years. He served as Vice-President of the Board of Trade and Paymaster-General under Lord Palmerston between 1860 and 1865 and under Lord Russell in 1865 and was sworn of the Privy Council in 1860.
In 1865 he became a Knight Commander of the Order of the Bath.

Personal life
In 1831 Hutt married Mary (née Millner), Dowager Countess of Strathmore, widow of John Bowes, 10th Earl of Strathmore and Kinghorne, to whose son John Bowes Hutt had been a tutor. She died in 1860, leaving him mining properties worth £18,000 a year. 

The following year he married Frances Anna Jane "Fanny" Stanhope, a daughter of the Hon. Sir Francis Charles Stanhope. The couple had a London home in Grosvenor Square.

Hutt died at Appley Towers, Ryde, on 24 November 1882, aged 81, leaving his landed property to his brother, Sir George Hutt. Frances, Lady Hutt, died in September 1886.

Eponymous geography
Hutt is commemorated in the name of the Hutt River in the North Island of New Zealand and the cities of Lower Hutt and Upper Hutt, which stand on its banks. The Hutt River, South Australia and the Hutt River and Hutt Lagoon in Western Australia were also named in his honour. Hutt Street, Adelaide in South Australia carries his name. The Bowes River in Western Australia was named after his wife Mary.

References

External links

 

1801 births
1882 deaths
Members of the Privy Council of the United Kingdom
Alumni of Trinity College, Cambridge
Members of the Parliament of the United Kingdom for English constituencies
Knights Commander of the Order of the Bath
UK MPs 1832–1835
UK MPs 1835–1837
UK MPs 1837–1841
UK MPs 1841–1847
UK MPs 1847–1852
UK MPs 1852–1857
UK MPs 1857–1859
UK MPs 1859–1865
UK MPs 1865–1868
People from Bishop's Stortford